Eurípedes Daniel Adão Amoreirinha (born 5 August 1984) is a Portuguese former professional footballer who played mainly as a central defender.

Club career
A product of S.L. Benfica's youth system, Amoreirinha was born in Vila Franca de Xira, Lisbon, and he made his Primeira Liga debut with farm team F.C. Alverca in 2003, then appeared in eight matches with the former in the following season as they conquered the national title after 11 years. He finished the campaign on loan, at modest G.D. Estoril Praia.

After two seasons on loan with C.F. Estrela da Amadora, Amoreirinha was released by Benfica and moved to Romania's CFR Cluj for €1 million, joining the club's massive Portuguese contingent. In February 2008, he was loaned to fellow Liga I side FCM UTA Arad.

In January of the following year, Amoreirinha returned to Portugal, moving to Académica de Coimbra and being almost exclusively used as a backup in the following top flight campaigns, after which he was released in June 2011. He met exactly the same fate in the same amount of time in his next club, Vitória de Setúbal.

On 5 August 2014, after an unassuming spell in India and a few months with Sport Benfica e Castelo Branco, Amoreirinha signed for C.D. Santa Clara in the second division. In June of the following year, he joined fellow league team F.C. Penafiel.

Club statistics

Honours
Benfica
Primeira Liga: 2004–05
Supertaça Cândido de Oliveira: Runner-up 2004

CFR Cluj
Liga I: 2007–08
Cupa României: 2007–08

References

External links

1984 births
Living people
People from Vila Franca de Xira
Portuguese footballers
Association football defenders
Primeira Liga players
Liga Portugal 2 players
Segunda Divisão players
F.C. Alverca players
S.L. Benfica footballers
G.D. Estoril Praia players
C.F. Estrela da Amadora players
Associação Académica de Coimbra – O.A.F. players
Vitória F.C. players
Sport Benfica e Castelo Branco players
C.D. Santa Clara players
F.C. Penafiel players
Liga I players
CFR Cluj players
FC UTA Arad players
Churchill Brothers FC Goa players
Portugal youth international footballers
Portugal under-21 international footballers
Portuguese expatriate footballers
Expatriate footballers in Romania
Expatriate footballers in India
Portuguese expatriate sportspeople in Romania
Portuguese expatriate sportspeople in India
Sportspeople from Lisbon District